Varma Films was a film production and distribution company founded in Bombay, India and predominantly involved in producing and distributing Hindi-language films. 

During its 18-year existence, starting from its inception with the release of the film Suhaag Raat in 1948, to the release of its last film, Budtameez  in 1966, Varma Films and its affiliates distributed 18 films, of which 12 were produced by them. This corresponds to an average of one film per year. In his sample of 274,991 films with 269,385 individual producers over the years 1949 to 2018, Follows (2019) finds that the average producer starting out in 1950 would go on to produce 6 films over his/her career span.  With 18 of the films distributed by Varma Films including 12 films produced by the company, the above benchmark is an indicator of the notability of Varma Films arising from their prolific productivity.

History
Founded in 1948 by six brothers in the Varma family (Ramrakha, Munshiram, Bhagwan Das, Biharilal, Walatiram and Santram),
Varma Films was initially involved only with distributing films and afterward with producing as well as distributing Hindi-language films.  The first film distributed by the company was Suhaag Raat (1948).  
The first film produced by Varma Films was Patanga (1949).  
Subsequently, the company either produced and/or distributed the following films: Thes (1949), Neki Aur Badi (1949),  Sagai (1951), Badal (1951), Parbat (1952), Aurat (1953), Ladla (1954) and Pooja (1954).  

Of the ten films mentioned above, three were box-office hits: Suhaag Raat was the seventh highest-grossing film of 1948;
Patanga was the seventh highest-grossing film of 1949;
and finally Badal was the eighth highest-grossing film of 1951.
Presumably, the most prominent among the six brothers who founded Varma Films were Munshiram and Bhagwan Das.  Munshiram was the producer of four of the above films (Suhaag Raat, Thes, Neki Aur Badi and Aurat) whereas Bhagwan Das worked as a producer for one film (Badal) and a director for two films (Aurat and Pooja). In 1954, Bhagwan Das married actress Purnima, who had worked in a majority of the films produced by Varma Films; it was Purnima’s second marriage.   

After the Varma Films banner was retired in the mid-1950s, the six Varma brothers continued their film production and distribution activities with affiliated companies.  Varma Pictures was associated with Night Club (1958) and Main Nashe Mein Hoon (1959), V P Productions with Baghi Sipahi (1958), Varma Productions with Ankh Micholi (1962), and finally Varma Brothers with Budtameez (1966). Bhagwan Das Varma worked as the producer as well as the director for Baghi Sipahi. Varma Brothers also briefly dabbled with the subtitled theatrical distribution of Italian films in India. Specifically, the films distributed by the company were Boccaccio '70 (1962), Marriage Italian Style (1964) and The 10th Victim (1965). Of these three films, two were commercially successful in Italy.  Specifically, on the List of highest-grossing films in Italy, Marriage Italian Style ranked 38th and Boccaccio '70 ranked 104th. On the other hand, The 10th Victim  performed below expectations in Italy.

A second generation of participation in the film industry was pursued by the children of the founders of Varma Films.  Jagdish Varma, son of Bhagwan Das Varma, one of the founders of Varma Films, started a new production and distribution company called J.V. Film Enterprises associated with Insaaniyat  (1974) and Oonch Neech Beech (1989).    Aroon Varma, son of Santram Varma, also one of the founders of Varma Films, started a new company called Varma Film Enterprises and produced Balidaan (1971).  Kiran Singh née Varma, daughter of Santram Varma, married actor and producer Sujit Kumar, who in a career spanning four decades, was regarded as the first superstar of the Bhojpuri cinema. Together with Sujit, Kiran produced Anubhav (1986), Asmaan Se Ooncha (1989), and  Khel (1992).  Madhu Makkar née Varma, daughter of Munshiram Varma (another founder of Varma Films), played the female lead in Insaaniyat (1974) opposite veteran actor Shashi Kapoor; Surinder Makkar, spouse of Madhu Makkar, worked as a character actor in Insaaniyat. More participation from the children of Munshiram Varma came from his sons Sunil and Pammy (a.k.a. Rajesh). Sunil Varma was the executive producer of Insaaniyat. Pammy Varma, was the co-producer of Mard (1985), which was the second highest-grossing film of 1985, and the eighth highest-grossing film of the 1980s (1980 to 1989). Furthermore, after years of working as the assistant director/second-unit director of Manmohan Desai, leading director of the 1970s, Pammy Varma made his debut as the independent director of Ek Misaal (1986). Finally, Purnima Das Varma’s son from her first marriage, Anwar Hashmi, worked as a character actor in  Baharon Ki Manzil (1968).

A third generation of participation in the film industry comes from the grandchildren of the six Varma brothers that founded Varma Films.   Most prominent among them is Emraan Hashmi, a film actor. He is the grandson of Purnima Das Varma who had married Bhagwan Das Varma, one of the founders of Varma Films. Purnima’s son from her first marriage, Anwar Hashmi, is Emraan’s father, making Bhagwandas Varma Emraan’s step grandfather. Other participation comes from Chandan Arora, film editor/director and recipient of the 2003 Filmfare Award for Best Editing, who is the spouse of Minal Arora, granddaughter of Sumitra, sister of the six Varma brothers that founded Varma Films. Still more involvement in the film industry comes from the grandchildren of the six original Varma brothers that became film and TV actors, including Sid Makkar, Giriraj Kabra,  Amit Varma,  Mihika Varma, Mishkat Varma and Zulfi Syed. Sid Makkar is the grandson of Munshiram Varma, one of the founders of Varma Films and Giriraj Kabra is the spouse of Seher Kabra née Varma, granddaughter of Munshiram Varma. Amit Varma is the grandson of Biharilal Varma, a founder of Varma Films.  Sister and brother, Mihika Varma and Mishkat Varma, are the grandchildren of Waltiram Varma, another founder of Varma Films. Zulfi Syed is married to Sheena, granddaughter of Santram Varma, also one of the founders of Varma Films. Finally, Jatin Kumar, also grandson of Santram Varma, and son of Sujit Kumar and Kiran Singh née Varma, was the producer of Aetbaar (2004).

Filmography
(Hindi-language films produced and distributed by Varma Films as well as affiliated firms. Films only distributed by Varma Films or affiliates are marked with a *)

(Italian-language films distributed by Varma Brothers, an affiliate of Varma Films, for theatrical release only in India.)

References

Film distributors of India
Mass media companies established in 1948
Hindi cinema
Film production companies based in Mumbai
1948 establishments in India